Visitors to Mongolia must obtain a visa unless they come from one of the visa-exempt countries. Nationals of certain countries may obtain a visa on arrival or an e-Visa online, while others must obtain a visa from a Mongolian diplomatic mission.

Visitors must hold passports that are valid for at least 6 months from the date of arrival.

Visa policy
Visitors from any country planning to stay in Mongolia for more than 30 days must register with the Mongolia Immigration Agency in Ulaanbaatar within the first seven days of arrival. Visitors who fail to register and who stay longer than 30 days, even for reasons beyond their control, will be stopped at departure, temporarily denied exit, and fined. Until 1997, individual tourists wishing to visit Mongolia needed a letter of invitation from either a Mongolian citizen or a foreign resident before being granted a visa. Since then the visa regime has been greatly liberalised with a resultant increase in tourism.

Mongolia previously had a temporary unilateral visa waiver for the citizens of 42 countries in place between June 2014 and December 2015.

Visa exemptions
Mongolia grants visa-free access to citizens of 61 countries and territories.

Non-ordinary passports

Visa exemption applies only to holders of diplomatic passports of Czech Republic, Estonia (biometric passports only), France, Italy, United Kingdom and holders of diplomatic or official/service passports of Albania,  Armenia, Azerbaijan, Brunei, Bulgaria, Cambodia, Chile, China, Colombia, Croatia, Cyprus, Greece, Hungary, India, Indonesia, Kuwait, Latvia, Lithuania, Malta, Mexico, Myanmar, Nepal, North Korea, Peru, Poland, Romania, Slovakia, South Korea, Switzerland, Turkmenistan, and Vietnam.

Nationals of China holding passports for public affairs do not require a visa for a maximum stay of 30 days.

The holders of United Nations Laissez-Passer (UNLP) and the officials of the UN Specialized Agencies travelling to Mongolia for the purposes of business and residency are exempt from visa requirements for 30 days.

Visa on arrival
Nationals of the following 36 countries do not need a local sponsor or approval prior to arrival and can apply for a visa valid for 30 days independently at a border crossing:

Electronic visa
The following 99 countries and territories may obtain an e-Visa online:

E-Visas have been available since 1 October 2021, and the number of eligible countries increased from 36 to 98 in February 2023.

E-Visa applications will be processed in 3 working days.

Visa collection on arrival 
Holders of confirmation of a pre-arranged visa can obtain a single entry visa on arrival at Chinggis Khaan International Airport, provided they are in possession of a completed visa application form and a passport photo, are arriving from a country without diplomatic representation of Mongolia, and have a sponsor in Mongolia who submits request to the Mongolian Immigration Authority.

Statistics
Most visitors arriving to Mongolia on short term basis for tourism were from the following countries of nationality:

See also

Visa requirements for Mongolian citizens

References

External links
Mongolian Immigration 
Consular Department of the Ministry of Foreign Affairs of Mongolia
Mongolian Electronic Visa

Mongolia
Foreign relations of Mongolia
Tourism in Mongolia